Alan Taylor may refer to:

 Alan Taylor (Australian judge) (1901–1969), Australian High Court judge
 A. J. P. Taylor (Alan John Percivale Taylor, 1906–1990), British historian
 Alan Taylor (television presenter) (1924–1997), Welsh television presenter
 Alan Taylor (British judge) (born 1939), British judge
 Alan Taylor (footballer, born 1943), English football manager and former goalkeeper for Blackpool
 Alan D. Taylor (born 1947), mathematician
 Alan Taylor (volleyball) (born 1950), Canadian volleyball player
 Alan Taylor (footballer, born 1953), English football player for West Ham United
 Alan Taylor (historian) (born 1955), United States historian
 Alan Taylor (director) (born 1959), American film director
 Alan M. Taylor (born 1964), economist

See also
 Allan Taylor (disambiguation)
 Alan B. Tayler (1931–1995), British applied mathematician